Guilt Hulk is a supervillain appearing in American comic books published by Marvel Comics. The character is depicted usually as an antagonist to the Hulk. Created by writer Peter David and artist Dale Keown, the character first appeared in The Incredible Hulk Vol. 2, #377 (January 1991) as a malevolent representation of Bruce Banner's abusive father Brian Banner that manifests itself in Banner's childhood memories.

Fictional character history 

A malevolent alternate personality of Bruce Banner, the Guilt Hulk embodies all of Bruce's guilt, shame, and regrets. Existing within Bruce's mind, the entity seeks to manifest and run amok in the real world.

In the 1991 storyline in which the Guilt Hulk first appears, Doc Samson employs the Ringmaster's expertise with hypnosis in an attempt to unify Banner's fractured mental state. This allows Banner to experience aspects of his own mind, including childhood memories, from both an objective and participatory viewpoint. During these hypnosis sessions, Banner interacts with his warring split personalities, the Savage Hulk and Joe Fixit. The Guilt Hulk interferes with the treatment, tormenting Bruce and the Hulks by replacing Bruce's abusive father Brian in traumatic memories. By confronting the source of his mental illness, Banner is able to banish the Guilt Hulk, and cause the emergence of the Professor, a more stable personality initially assumed to be a fusion of Banner, the Savage Hulk, and Fixit.

The Guilt Hulk, possessing a slightly altered appearance, returns years later as Banner is dying of Lou Gehrig's Disease. Empowered by the guilt felt by the dying Bruce for the death of Betty Ross, Guilt Hulk tries to overtake Banner's mind, a process made easier for it due to the other Hulks being suppressed by Banner. Using a machine created by neuroscientist Angela Lipscombe, Banner enters his own subconscious, and frees Fixit and the Professor, though the two are outmatched by the Guilt Hulk until Banner seeks the aid of the Savage Hulk. Together, the three manage to overpower the Guilt Hulk.

When Brian Banner is released from Hell during the 2010-2011 "Chaos War" storyline, he becomes a fusion of the Guilt Hulk and the Devil Hulk.

Powers and abilities
While the Guilt Hulk has not manifested in the real world, in Banner's mind it was enormous in size, possessed claws and fangs, and was capable of fending off two other Hulks. In its debut, the Guilt Hulk was covered in spikes, could breathe fire, and torture Banner and the other personalities through Banner's memories.

Other versions
In an issue of What If?, Banner's initial confrontation with the Guilt Hulk ends with him "killing" the entity himself which leads to him gradually transforming into Maestro.

References

Hulk (comics)
Marvel Comics mutates
Characters created by Peter David
Comics characters introduced in 1991
Fictional characters with fire or heat abilities
Marvel Comics characters with superhuman strength